Bishop Milner Catholic College (previously Bishop Milner Catholic School) is a Roman Catholic secondary school and sixth form with academy status, located in the Eve Hill area of Dudley, West Midlands, England. Enrolment includes students who live beyond Dudley's borders, mostly in Sandwell. The college also has enrolled a number of non-Catholic pupils.

History
The College first opened as Bishop Milner Catholic School in 1960 to serve the township of Dudley, and was one of the first Catholic secondary schools in the Midlands. In 1963 an extension was added to the main college building as well as with a new dining hall. In 1981 a "Secretary's" block was also opened. A new classroom block for the teaching of Drama, Music, Dance, ICT, General classrooms and sixth form studies was opened in October 1994.

Most of the school buildings were replaced between 2002 and 2005 at a cost of more than £6million.

In the Autumn term of 2011 the reception area was extended and additional office space created above the reception on the first floor. In 2012 the sixth form area was updated to include a café area named "The Hub" along with the formation of enhanced study facilities. As a consequence and to create the Sixth Form study area, Drama/Performing Arts is now taught in the main building In the autumn term of 2013 the college obtained planning permission for a Sports Hall and is now in the process of securing the funding to commence the build.

Bishop Milner converted voluntarily to academy status in September 2013 and took the name of Bishop Milner Catholic College.  The Academy was formed in partnership with St Chad's Catholic Primary School, Sedgley and St Joseph's Catholic Primary School, Dudley. Together, the three schools are a Multi Academy Company (MAC) and have taken the name of St John Bosco Catholic Academy. Bishop Milner Catholic College is named after John Milner, a Roman Catholic bishop and writer who served as the Vicar Apostolic of the Midland District from 1803 to 1826.

Bishop Milner Catholic College performs well in the local GCSE tables and is regularly among the highest performing schools Dudley borough. It has an extensive extra curricular provision, which includes the Duke of Edinburgh Award Scheme up to Gold level, Sports teams, dance encompassing both "street" and "contemporary", science club and a multi media club. Bishop Milner is one of the few secondary schools in the Dudley borough to have a sixth form, as most of the other sixth forms closed at the turn of the 1990s following the introduction of tertiary education across the area. The college offers an extensive range of sixth form courses at Level 3 which include A Levels and BTEC Nationals. Bishop Milner has an excellent record of its sixth form students attaining places at university including the prestigious Russell Group. The college prides itself with the links it has with local universities such as Birmingham, Newman and Wolverhampton along with those that are further afield e.g. Oxford. The college also secured places on the Prime Minister's Global Fellowship programme. The college achieved its first student in the inaugural year of the programme, 2008, and in 2009 had 2 more successful applicants.

Notable former pupils

 Reanne Evans, world ladies' snooker champion

References

External links
Bishop Milner Catholic College official website

Secondary schools in the Metropolitan Borough of Dudley
Catholic secondary schools in the Archdiocese of Birmingham
Educational institutions established in 1960
1960 establishments in England
Academies in the Metropolitan Borough of Dudley